Bevacqua is a last name of Italian and French origin. It literally means "water drinker", and was used to refer to a teetotaller. Notable people with the surname include:

Daniel Bevilacqua, singer and musician better known as  Christophe
Jonas Bevacqua, founder of Lifted Research Group
Julio Bevacqua, footballer
Kurt Bevacqua, former baseball player

References